Notable people named Angeles include:

Given name

Ángeles Caso (born 1959), Spanish journalist, translator, and writer
Ángeles Mastretta (born 1949), Mexican author and journalist
Ángeles Montolio (born 1975), Spanish tennis player
Ángeles González-Sinde (born 1965), Spanish scriptwriter, film director and previous Culture Minister of Spain
Ángeles Balbiani (born 1982), Argentine actress
Ángeles Parejo (born 1969), Spanish footballer
Ángeles Santos Torroella (1911–2013), Catalan painter

Surname
Arturo Angeles (born 1953), American soccer referee
Darwin Angeles (born 1968), Honduran boxer
Felipe Ángeles (1868–1919), Mexican military officer
Hero Angeles (born 1984), Filipino actor
Jacobo Angeles (born 1973), Mexican artisan
Jenzel Angeles (born 1995), Filipina actress and model
Juanita Ángeles (1900–?), Filipina actress
Marwin Angeles (born 1991), Italian-born Filipino footballer
Paulo Angeles (born 1997), Fiiipino actor, singer and dancer
Regine Angeles (born 1985), Filipina model and actress
Rosalín Ángeles (born 1985), Dominican volleyball player